Tomorrow's Champions was a local television program in Louisville, Kentucky, which featured bouts between local amateur boxers. It aired on NBC affiliate WAVE from 1954 to 1966. It was produced by Louisville police officer and boxing trainer Joe Martin. Future World Heavyweight Champions Muhammad Ali and Jimmy Ellis got their starts boxing on the program.

Sources
The Encyclopedia of Louisville, Volume 2000 by John E. Kleber

Boxing television series
Defunct mass media in Louisville, Kentucky
Sports in Louisville, Kentucky
1954 American television series debuts
1956 American television series endings